Urine-indicator dye is a mythical substance that is supposed to be able to react with urine to form a colored cloud in a swimming pool or hot tub, thus indicating the location of people who are urinating while they are in the water. A 2015 report from the National Swimming Pool Foundation called this "the most common pool myth of all time", with nearly half of Americans surveyed by researchers believing that the dye existed.

Urine is difficult to detect, as many of the naturally occurring compounds within urine are unstable and react freely with common disinfectants, such as chlorine, creating a large number of disinfection by-product (DBP) compounds from the original organic chemicals in urine.

Rumours of the origin of urine indicator-dye go back at least as far as 1958, and the story is commonly told to children by parents who do not want them to urinate in the pool. A 1985 biography of Orson Welles describes him using such a dye as part of a prank in 1937.

References

Fictional materials
Swimming pools
Urban legends
Urine